Sivert Vause Samuelson (21 November 1883 – 18 November 1958) was a South African cricketer who played in one Test in 1910.

Samuelson was an off-spin bowler and tail-end right-handed batsman who took five MCC wickets in an innings in his third first-class game and found himself in the Test team for the final match in the 1909–10 series, played at Newlands, Cape Town. He failed to take a wicket as England scored 417, with Jack Hobbs making 187. He batted at No 11 in both innings.

Samuelson played only one season of Currie Cup cricket for Natal, in 1910–11, taking 13 wickets in each of two matches and finishing with 41 wickets in the season at an average of less than 14 runs per wicket. But he then played only a couple more games the following season, and his only other first-class game was against MCC more than a decade later in 1922–23.

References

External links
 
 

1883 births
1958 deaths
South Africa Test cricketers
South African cricketers
KwaZulu-Natal cricketers